Yasser Mahmoud (born 5 November 1975) is an Egyptian former fencer. He competed in the individual and team épée events at the 2004 Summer Olympics.

References

External links
 

1975 births
Living people
Egyptian male épée fencers
Olympic fencers of Egypt
Fencers at the 2004 Summer Olympics
20th-century Egyptian people
21st-century Egyptian people